The 2005 A-League Pre-Season Challenge Cup was played in the lead up to the inaugural (2005-06) A-League season. It was won by the Central Coast Mariners, who beat Perth Glory in the final.

Group stage

Group A

Group B

Knockout stage

Semi-finals

Final

Top scorers

A-League Pre-Season Challenge Cup
Chall